Barguna Sadar is an upazila of Barguna District in the Division of Barisal, Bangladesh.

Geography
It has 41868 households and a total area of 454.39 km2.

History

In 1904, a thana (police outpost headquarters) was founded in Barguna. During the Bangladesh Liberation War of 1971, many people were murdered in Barguna town as well as the Bengali freedom fighters when retreating. 100 prisoners at the Barguna Jail were killed by the Pakistan Army on 29 and 30 November and they were later buried in a mass grave to the west of the Jail. By 3 December, Barguna had been liberated. Barguna Sadar Thana's status was upgraded to upazila (sub-district) in 1983 as part of the President of Bangladesh Hussain Muhammad Ershad's decentralisation programme.

Demographics
According to the 1991 Bangladesh census, Barguna Sadar had a population of 219,729. Males constituted 50.7% of the population, and females 49.3%. The population aged 18 or over was 111,209. Barguna Sadar had an average literacy rate of 90.8% (7+ years), compared to the national average of 72.4%. Majority of its residents are Bengali Muslims, though there is a substantial population of Bengali Hindus as well as a minority Rakhine Buddhist community in Baliatali Union.

Administration
Barguna Sadar Upazila is divided into Barguna Municipality and ten union parishads: Aylapatakata, Barguna, Bodorkhali, Burirchor, Dhalua, Fuljhuri, Gowrichanna, Keorabunia, M. Baliatali, and Noltona. The union parishads are subdivided into 51 mauzas and 191 villages.

Barguna Municipality is subdivided into 9 wards and 18 mahallas.

See also
 Upazilas of Bangladesh
 Districts of Bangladesh
 Divisions of Bangladesh

References

Upazilas of Barguna District